Al-Ain Sport Club, is an Iraqi football team based in Baghdad, that plays in the Iraq Division Three.

Managerial history
 Raad Jabbar
 Ali Ghafil

See also
 2021–22 Iraq Division Three

References

External links
 Iraq Clubs- Foundation Dates

Football clubs in Iraq
2004 establishments in Iraq
Association football clubs established in 2004
Football clubs in Baghdad